The Little Badger Island, part of the Badger Group within the Furneaux Group, is a  unpopulated low-lying granite island, located in Bass Strait, lying west of the Flinders and Cape Barren islands, Tasmania, south of Victoria, in south-eastern Australia.

The island is contained within a nature reserve. The island is also part of the Chalky, Big Green and Badger Island Groups Important Bird Area.

Fauna
Recorded breeding seabird and wader species include little penguin, short-tailed shearwater, white-faced storm-petrel, Pacific gull, silver gull, sooty oystercatcher, black-faced cormorant and Caspian tern.

See also

 List of islands of Tasmania

References

Furneaux Group
Protected areas of Tasmania
Important Bird Areas of Tasmania
Islands of North East Tasmania
Islands of Bass Strait